The 1968–69 Pittsburgh Penguins season was the franchise's second season in the National Hockey League.

Offseason

Regular season

Final standings

Record vs. opponents

Schedule and results

|- style="background:#ffc;"
| 1 || Oct 12 || Montreal Canadiens || 1–1 || Pittsburgh Penguins || Montreal Forum (10,701) || 0–0–1 || 1
|- style="background:#ffc;"
| 2 || Oct 16 || Pittsburgh Penguins || 2–2 || Toronto Maple Leafs || Maple Leaf Gardens (16,321) || 0–0–2 || 2
|- style="background:#fcf;"
| 3 || Oct 17 || Pittsburgh Penguins || 0–3 || Philadelphia Flyers || The Spectrum (9,862) || 0–1–2 || 2
|- style="background:#fcf;"
| 4 || Oct 19 || Boston Bruins || 5–1 || Pittsburgh Penguins || Boston Garden (8,071) || 0–2–2 || 2
|- style="background:#fcf;"
| 5 || Oct 23 || Chicago Black Hawks || 8–5 || Pittsburgh Penguins || Chicago Stadium (5,889) || 0–3–2 || 2
|- style="background:#cfc;"
| 6 || Oct 26 || St. Louis Blues || 2–4 || Pittsburgh Penguins || St. Louis Arena (7,026) || 1–3–2 || 4
|- style="background:#fcf;"
| 7 || Oct 30 || Pittsburgh Penguins || 3–7 || New York Rangers || Madison Square Garden (IV) (13,111) || 1–4–2 || 4
|-

|- style="background:#fcf;"
| 8 || Nov 2 || Pittsburgh Penguins || 2–3 || Los Angeles Kings || The Forum (6,602) || 1–5–2 || 4
|- style="background:#cfc;"
| 9 || Nov 3 || Pittsburgh Penguins || 3–1 || Oakland Seals || Oakland Coliseum Arena (2,166) || 2–5–2 || 6
|- style="background:#fcf;"
| 10 || Nov 6 || St. Louis Blues || 3–1 || Pittsburgh Penguins || St. Louis Arena (8,526) || 2–6–2 || 6
|- style="background:#fcf;"
| 11 || Nov 7 || Pittsburgh Penguins || 4–5 || Montreal Canadiens || Montreal Forum (16,704) || 2–7–2 || 6
|- style="background:#fcf;"
| 12 || Nov 9 || Philadelphia Flyers || 3–0 || Pittsburgh Penguins || The Spectrum (7,284) || 2–8–2 || 6
|- style="background:#fcf;"
| 13 || Nov 13 || Pittsburgh Penguins || 5–6 || Chicago Black Hawks || Chicago Stadium (16,666) || 2–9–2 || 6
|- style="background:#fcf;"
| 14 || Nov 14 || Chicago Black Hawks || 6–4 || Pittsburgh Penguins || Chicago Stadium (5,386) || 2–10–2 || 6
|- style="background:#fcf;"
| 15 || Nov 16 || New York Rangers || 2–1 || Pittsburgh Penguins || Madison Square Garden (IV) (7,062) || 2–11–2 || 6
|- style="background:#fcf;"
| 16 || Nov 20 || Pittsburgh Penguins || 2–5 || Toronto Maple Leafs || Maple Leaf Gardens (16,356) || 2–12–2 || 6
|- style="background:#cfc;"
| 17 || Nov 21 || Oakland Seals || 1–3 || Pittsburgh Penguins || Oakland Coliseum Arena (3,506) || 3–12–2 || 8
|- style="background:#ffc;"
| 18 || Nov 23 || Los Angeles Kings || 2–2 || Pittsburgh Penguins || The Forum (6,242) || 3–12–3 || 9
|- style="background:#ffc;"
| 19 || Nov 27 || Toronto Maple Leafs || 3–3 || Pittsburgh Penguins || Maple Leaf Gardens (7,107) || 3–12–4 || 10
|- style="background:#cfc;"
| 20 || Nov 28 || Pittsburgh Penguins || 3–2 || Chicago Black Hawks || Chicago Stadium (16,666) || 4–12–4 || 12
|- style="background:#cfc;"
| 21 || Nov 30 || Pittsburgh Penguins || 4–2 || Los Angeles Kings || The Forum (7,243) || 5–12–4 || 14
|-

|- style="background:#ffc;"
| 22 || Dec 1 || Pittsburgh Penguins || 4–4 || Oakland Seals || Oakland Coliseum Arena (2,676) || 5–12–5 || 15
|- style="background:#fcf;"
| 23 || Dec 4 || Detroit Red Wings || 7–2 || Pittsburgh Penguins || Olympia Stadium (4,451) || 5–13–5 || 15
|- style="background:#ffc;"
| 24 || Dec 7 || Pittsburgh Penguins || 1–1 || St. Louis Blues || St. Louis Arena (15,057) || 5–13–6 || 16
|- style="background:#fcf;"
| 25 || Dec 8 || Toronto Maple Leafs || 4–1 || Pittsburgh Penguins || Maple Leaf Gardens (5,167) || 5–14–6 || 16
|- style="background:#cfc;"
| 26 || Dec 11 || Pittsburgh Penguins || 4–2 || Minnesota North Stars || Met Center (10,068) || 6–14–6 || 18
|- style="background:#fcf;"
| 27 || Dec 14 || Los Angeles Kings || 2–1 || Pittsburgh Penguins || The Forum (6,346) || 6–15–6 || 18
|- style="background:#fcf;"
| 28 || Dec 15 || Pittsburgh Penguins || 3–5 || Boston Bruins || Boston Garden (14,436) || 6–16–6 || 18
|- style="background:#fcf;"
| 29 || Dec 17 || Pittsburgh Penguins || 2–8 || Philadelphia Flyers || The Spectrum (6,986) || 6–17–6 || 18
|- style="background:#fcf;"
| 30 || Dec 21 || Minnesota North Stars || 3–1 || Pittsburgh Penguins || Met Center (5,307) || 6–18–6 || 18
|- style="background:#fcf;"
| 31 || Dec 22 || Pittsburgh Penguins || 1–3 || Chicago Black Hawks || Chicago Stadium (16,666) || 6–19–6 || 18
|- style="background:#cfc;"
| 32 || Dec 25 || Detroit Red Wings || 3–6 || Pittsburgh Penguins || Olympia Stadium (2,420) || 7–19–6 || 20
|- style="background:#fcf;"
| 33 || Dec 26 || Pittsburgh Penguins || 2–3 || St. Louis Blues || St. Louis Arena (15,056) || 7–20–6 || 20
|- style="background:#fcf;"
| 34 || Dec 28 || Oakland Seals || 4–3 || Pittsburgh Penguins || Oakland Coliseum Arena (8,196) || 7–21–6 || 20
|- style="background:#fcf;"
| 35 || Dec 31 || Montreal Canadiens || 4–3 || Pittsburgh Penguins || Montreal Forum (3,979) || 7–22–6 || 20
|-

|- style="background:#cfc;"
| 36 || Jan 2 || Pittsburgh Penguins || 5–2 || Montreal Canadiens || Montreal Forum (16,104) || 8–22–6 || 22
|- style="background:#ffc;"
| 37 || Jan 4 || Philadelphia Flyers || 1–1 || Pittsburgh Penguins || The Spectrum (6,329) || 8–22–7 || 23
|- style="background:#fcf;"
| 38 || Jan 5 || Pittsburgh Penguins || 1–2 || Detroit Red Wings || Olympia Stadium (10,973) || 8–23–7 || 23
|- style="background:#cfc;"
| 39 || Jan 9 || Minnesota North Stars || 2–7 || Pittsburgh Penguins || Met Center (4,017) || 9–23–7 || 25
|- style="background:#fcf;"
| 40 || Jan 11 || Oakland Seals || 4–2 || Pittsburgh Penguins || Oakland Coliseum Arena (7,101) || 9–24–7 || 25
|- style="background:#fcf;"
| 41 || Jan 12 || Pittsburgh Penguins || 4–8 || Boston Bruins || Boston Garden (14,659) || 9–25–7 || 25
|- style="background:#cfc;"
| 42 || Jan 15 || Pittsburgh Penguins || 3–1 || Minnesota North Stars || Met Center (10,355) || 10–25–7 || 27
|- style="background:#fcf;"
| 43 || Jan 16 || Pittsburgh Penguins || 2–3 || Detroit Red Wings || Olympia Stadium (10,623) || 10–26–7 || 27
|- style="background:#fcf;"
| 44 || Jan 18 || Pittsburgh Penguins || 0–4 || Los Angeles Kings || The Forum (9,172) || 10–27–7 || 27
|- style="background:#fcf;"
| 45 || Jan 19 || Pittsburgh Penguins || 3–6 || Oakland Seals || Oakland Coliseum Arena (3,436) || 10–28–7 || 27
|- style="background:#fcf;"
| 46 || Jan 23 || Minnesota North Stars || 3–1 || Pittsburgh Penguins || Met Center (3,806) || 10–29–7 || 27
|- style="background:#fcf;"
| 47 || Jan 25 || Toronto Maple Leafs || 2–0 || Pittsburgh Penguins || Maple Leaf Gardens (10,109) || 10–30–7 || 27
|- style="background:#fcf;"
| 48 || Jan 26 || Pittsburgh Penguins || 3–5 || Philadelphia Flyers || The Spectrum (10,987) || 10–31–7 || 27
|- style="background:#fcf;"
| 49 || Jan 29 || St. Louis Blues || 2–1 || Pittsburgh Penguins || St. Louis Arena (3,185) || 10–32–7 || 27
|-

|- style="background:#ffc;"
| 50 || Feb 1 || Philadelphia Flyers || 2–2 || Pittsburgh Penguins || The Spectrum (5,866) || 10–32–8 || 28
|- style="background:#fcf;"
| 51 || Feb 2 || Pittsburgh Penguins || 3–7 || New York Rangers || Madison Square Garden (IV) (17,250) || 10–33–8 || 28
|- style="background:#cfc;"
| 52 || Feb 5 || New York Rangers || 2–3 || Pittsburgh Penguins || Madison Square Garden (IV) (4,024) || 11–33–8 || 30
|- style="background:#fcf;"
| 53 || Feb 8 || Los Angeles Kings || 4–2 || Pittsburgh Penguins || The Forum (5,933) || 11–34–8 || 30
|- style="background:#fcf;"
| 54 || Feb 9 || Pittsburgh Penguins || 1–3 || Minnesota North Stars || Met Center (12,342) || 11–35–8 || 30
|- style="background:#fcf;"
| 55 || Feb 12 || Pittsburgh Penguins || 0–2 || St. Louis Blues || St. Louis Arena (13,235) || 11–36–8 || 30
|- style="background:#ffc;"
| 56 || Feb 15 || Oakland Seals || 4–4 || Pittsburgh Penguins || Oakland Coliseum Arena (5,277) || 11–36–9 || 31
|- style="background:#fcf;"
| 57 || Feb 16 || Montreal Canadiens || 4–0 || Pittsburgh Penguins || Montreal Forum (5,882) || 11–37–9 || 31
|- style="background:#cfc;"
| 58 || Feb 19 || Boston Bruins || 0–3 || Pittsburgh Penguins || Boston Garden (3,189) || 12–37–9 || 33
|- style="background:#fcf;"
| 59 || Feb 20 || Pittsburgh Penguins || 0–3 || Detroit Red Wings || Olympia Stadium (12,331) || 12–38–9 || 33
|- style="background:#cfc;"
| 60 || Feb 22 || Detroit Red Wings || 2–3 || Pittsburgh Penguins || Olympia Stadium (8,785) || 13–38–9 || 35
|- style="background:#cfc;"
| 61 || Feb 27 || Chicago Black Hawks || 3–4 || Pittsburgh Penguins || Chicago Stadium (6,271) || 14–38–9 || 37
|-

|- style="background:#ffc;"
| 62 || Mar 1 || Pittsburgh Penguins || 3–3 || Toronto Maple Leafs || Maple Leaf Gardens (16,485) || 14–38–10 || 38
|- style="background:#fcf;"
| 63 || Mar 2 || Pittsburgh Penguins || 0–4 || Boston Bruins || Boston Garden (14,659) || 14–39–10 || 38
|- style="background:#cfc;"
| 64 || Mar 5 || St. Louis Blues || 2–4 || Pittsburgh Penguins || St. Louis Arena (4,310) || 15–39–10 || 40
|- style="background:#fcf;"
| 65 || Mar 8 || New York Rangers || 5–3 || Pittsburgh Penguins || Madison Square Garden (IV) (10,016) || 15–40–10 || 40
|- style="background:#fcf;"
| 66 || Mar 12 || Pittsburgh Penguins || 3–4 || New York Rangers || Madison Square Garden (IV) (17,250) || 15–41–10 || 40
|- style="background:#fcf;"
| 67 || Mar 15 || Pittsburgh Penguins || 1–3 || Los Angeles Kings || The Forum (8,218) || 15–42–10 || 40
|- style="background:#fcf;"
| 68 || Mar 16 || Pittsburgh Penguins || 2–7 || Oakland Seals || Oakland Coliseum Arena (3,608) || 15–43–10 || 40
|- style="background:#fcf;"
| 69 || Mar 19 || Boston Bruins || 3–2 || Pittsburgh Penguins || Boston Garden (3,942) || 15–44–10 || 40
|- style="background:#fcf;"
| 70 || Mar 20 || Pittsburgh Penguins || 3–5 || Montreal Canadiens || Montreal Forum (16,827) || 15–45–10 || 40
|- style="background:#cfc;"
| 71 || Mar 22 || Pittsburgh Penguins || 2–1 || St. Louis Blues || St. Louis Arena (15,157) || 16–45–10 || 42
|- style="background:#cfc;"
| 72 || Mar 23 || Minnesota North Stars || 0–5 || Pittsburgh Penguins || Met Center (3,739) || 17–45–10 || 44
|- style="background:#cfc;"
| 73 || Mar 25 || Pittsburgh Penguins || 3–1 || Minnesota North Stars || Met Center (11,572) || 18–45–10 || 46
|- style="background:#cfc;"
| 74 || Mar 26 || Los Angeles Kings || 4–8 || Pittsburgh Penguins || The Forum (8,156) || 19–45–10 || 48
|- style="background:#ffc;"
| 75 || Mar 29 || Pittsburgh Penguins || 3–3 || Philadelphia Flyers || The Spectrum (11,039) || 19–45–11 || 49
|- style="background:#cfc;"
| 76 || Mar 30 || Philadelphia Flyers || 1–2 || Pittsburgh Penguins || The Spectrum (5,783) || 20–45–11 || 51
|-

|- style="text-align:center;"
| Legend:       = Win       = Loss       = Tie

Playoffs
The Penguins were unable to make the playoffs for the second straight year.

Player statistics
Skaters

Goaltenders

†Denotes player spent time with another team before joining the Penguins.  Stats reflect time with the Penguins only.
‡Denotes player was traded mid-season.  Stats reflect time with the Penguins only.

Awards and records
Leo Boivin became the first to play 100 games for the Penguins during a 1–2 loss to Los Angeles on December 14. He played 100 of Pittsburgh's first 101 games.
Ken Schinkel established a new franchise record for lowest plus-minus with –39. He topped the previous record of –23 held by Val Fonteyne.
Jean Pronovost established a rookie record for the Penguins in terms of assists (25) and points (41).

Transactions
The Penguins were involved in the following transactions during the 1968–69 season:

Trades

Additions and subtractions

Draft picks

References

External links
Player statistics on Hockey Database
Game log on NHL Database

Pittsburgh Penguins seasons
Pittsburgh
Pittsburgh
Pitts
Pitts